Hardraw is a hamlet near Hawes within the Yorkshire Dales in North Yorkshire, England. It takes its name from the nearby Hardraw Force waterfall.
 
The old school house, built in 1875, can be seen in the centre of the photograph of the village, and the Pennine Way runs past the west side this building. The village centre lies further up the road, and access to Hardraw Force is via The Green Dragon pub.

Hardraw Church, dedicated in honour of St Mary and St John, was rebuilt by the Earl of Wharncliffe between 1879 and 1881. It is Grade II listed. It doubles as Darrowby Church in the British television series All Creatures Great and Small.

References

External links
Video footage of the beck, gill and force

Hamlets in North Yorkshire
Wensleydale